The rediATM network was an Australian ATM network originally operated and owned by Cuscal. On 14 August 2019, Cuscal sold the network to the Armaguard Group who subsequently closed the network by merging with their atmx network.

History
 1982 – RediTeller ATM network launched to support Australian credit unions
 2008 – Cuscal and its partners began rebranding RediTeller ATMs to rediATM 
 2009 – National Australia Bank joins the rediATM network, combining NAB's network of 1,700 ATMs with Cuscal's network of 1,400 ATMs 
 2010 – Bank of Queensland joins the rediATM network
 2017 – Suncorp Bank joins rediATM network
 2018 – National Australia Bank announces it will discontinue using the rediATM network from 1 January 2019
2019 – Armaguard finalises Cuscal rediATM Scheme acquisition on 14 August 2019
2021 – Network was closed and merged with atmx

Partnered financial institutions (before network closure)
After a large number of members withdrawing over the years from the network, only the following financial institutions remained partners after the rediATM network closure:
Bank of Queensland
Broken Hill Community Credit Union
Central Murray Credit Union
Central West Credit Union
BNK Banking Corporation (Goldfields Money)
Goulburn Murray Credit Union Co-Operative Limited (gmcu)
Horizon Bank
me Bank
Orange Credit Union
Police Bank Ltd (NSW)
Police Credit Union (SA and NT)
RACQ Bank
Bank WAW
Warwick Gympie Dalby Credit Union

References

External links
rediATM
Cuscal

Banking in Australia
Interbank networks